Freziera jaramilloi is a species of plant in the Pentaphylacaceae family. It is endemic to Colombia.

References

jaramilloi
Endemic flora of Colombia
Vulnerable plants
Taxonomy articles created by Polbot